This is a list of Scottish Labour MSPs. It includes all Members of the Scottish Parliament (MSPs) who represented Scottish Labour in the Scottish Parliament.

List of MSPs

Notes

References

External links
 Current and previous Members of the Scottish Parliament (MSPs), on the Scottish Parliament website
 Scottish Labour

List
Labour